Srđan Pecelj (born 12 March 1975) is a Serbian-Bosnian retired football defender.

Club career
He started his career playing in the youth teams of Velež Mostar for which he played in senior squad in the season 1991–92. Then he moved to Serbia to play for Red Star Belgrade. But, after not getting much play, he moved, next season, to another Belgrade club, Železnik. In 1994, Srđan made a big move, this time to Barcelona, but he only managed to stay in the B squad, for the next two years, due to heavy competition in the team. Then, he came back to Serbia where he first played one season in the newly promoted Čukarički, also a Belgrade club, and then returned to Red Star where he played two seasons, until 1999. That summer, he moved to Greece to play in the next two years in Paniliakos. In 2001, he played one season in Russian club Sokol Saratov. Then he moved to Japan and played for Shimizu S-Pulse in the J1 League and in the Austrian Bundesliga in Admira Wacker. The second half of the 2007–08 season he spent with SK Schwadorf 1936. Since summer 2008, he played in Croatia in Inter Zaprešić, one of the good sides in the Prva HNL League. After two seasons he moved to NK Novalja where he played the 2010–11 season.

International career
In 1997 he made 2 appearances for the FR Yugoslav U21 team.

He has played 5 matches for Bosnia and Herzegovina national football team, all of them part of the "Merdeka Cup" in June 2001.

Club statistics

Personal life
His brother Miljan is also a footballer.

References

External sources

 
 

1975 births
Living people
Sportspeople from Mostar
Association football central defenders
Serbia and Montenegro under-21 international footballers
Bosnia and Herzegovina footballers
Bosnia and Herzegovina international footballers
FK Velež Mostar players
Red Star Belgrade footballers
FK Železnik players
FC Barcelona Atlètic players
FK Čukarički players
Paniliakos F.C. players
FC Sokol Saratov players
Shimizu S-Pulse players
NK Inter Zaprešić players
FC Admira Wacker Mödling players
ASK Schwadorf players
NK Novalja players
Premier League of Bosnia and Herzegovina players
First League of Serbia and Montenegro players
Segunda División players
Super League Greece players
Russian Premier League players
J1 League players
Croatian Football League players
Second Football League (Croatia) players
Austrian Football Bundesliga players
Bosnia and Herzegovina expatriate footballers
Expatriate footballers in Serbia and Montenegro
Bosnia and Herzegovina expatriate sportspeople in Serbia and Montenegro
Expatriate footballers in Spain
Bosnia and Herzegovina expatriate sportspeople in Spain
Expatriate footballers in Greece
Bosnia and Herzegovina expatriate sportspeople in Greece
Expatriate footballers in Russia
Bosnia and Herzegovina expatriate sportspeople in Russia
Expatriate footballers in Japan
Bosnia and Herzegovina expatriate sportspeople in Japan
Expatriate footballers in Croatia
Bosnia and Herzegovina expatriate sportspeople in Croatia
Expatriate footballers in Austria
Bosnia and Herzegovina expatriate sportspeople in Austria
Expatriate footballers in Slovenia
Bosnia and Herzegovina expatriate sportspeople in Slovenia